Breezy is a 1973 American romantic drama film directed by Clint Eastwood, produced by Robert Daley, and written by Jo Heims. The film stars William Holden and Kay Lenz, with Roger C. Carmel, Marj Dusay, and Joan Hotchkis in supporting roles. It is the third film directed by Eastwood and the first without him starring in it.

Distributed by Universal Pictures, Breezy was theatrically released in Los Angeles on November 16, 1973 and in New York City on November 18, 1973. The film earned 3 nominations at the 31st Golden Globe Awards, including Most Promising Newcomer – Female for Lenz.

The film was not a commercial success.

Plot
A young couple awakens in bed after a one-night stand. Edith Alice "Breezy" Breezerman hops out of bed, gets dressed, and steps into the daylight. Breezy lost her parents years before in a car accident; she lived with her aunt until she graduated from high school. A year later, she left for California, where she is a homeless, free-spirited, carefree hippie spending her nights couch surfing.

That same morning, Frank Harmon is bidding farewell to his overnight guest, a blonde who is attracted to him, but he only humors her as she leaves. Middle-aged, divorced and wealthy from his work in real estate, Frank lacks for nothing material, but has no joy in his life. He is still somewhat bitter about his divorce.

After escaping a bad hitchhiking experience with an unstable stranger, Breezy loiters near Frank's luxurious post-modern house, the setting for much of the movie. When he leaves for work, she invites herself into his car and happily insists that he give her a ride to her destination, annoying him.  She returns to his house that evening to retrieve her guitar that she left in his car earlier in the day.  She persuades him to let her shower, after the shower she tries to get him to invite her to stay the night, but he doesn't go for it.  She leaves even though it's raining.  The next night he's awakened by police at the door.  They found Breezy wandering around and she told them that Frank was her uncle and they had argued earlier.  After being chastised by the police they leave and he offers her something to eat. She begs for him to take her to the ocean and he does.  When they return from the Pacific he carries her in to the guest room as she feigns sleep. Before going to bed himself they have a heart-to-heart where she tells him that she loves him.  When he wakes he's surprised and disappointed to discover that she left without saying goodbye.  The next day when he comes home from work she's waiting for him by his door.  He invites her in but tells her he has to make an appearance at a friend's wedding reception and drop off the papers for the house the couple just bought from him.   He tells her she could stay and they make plans for his return.  He's much later than anticipated and he's disappointed that she doesn't appear to be there.  He gets ready for bed and when he's in his room, he sees her in his bed and they make love.  In the morning he's very upbeat and seems very happy.  At the breakfast table they get to know each other.  They spend the day together and he buys her some new clothes, then they go to dinner and run into his ex-wife.  She has some snarky things to say but they don't let it ruin their evening.  Another night they go see a movie and run into Frank's friend Bob who seems to always talk about wanting to cheat on his wife.  Frank is embarrassed and self conscious to be seen with Breezy.  

He is conflicted about his feelings for longtime, close friend Betty Tobin. Finally, when he does awkwardly start to make them known to her, it is too late; Betty gently explains she is marrying a man she very much loves. 

Frank's friend and workout buddy Bob Henderson is grappling with his own mid-life crisis. He is restless, but afraid to end his now-loveless marriage and face loneliness. Frank takes this into consideration, while still growing closer to Breezy.  Bob talks to Frank about Breezy in a sauna after some tennis. Bob reveals that there is no way he himself could embark on such a relationship, as he might feel like a "child molester". He has no intention of being insulting, and is in fact admiring Frank's defiance of society's disapproval, but Frank is not immune to the pressure. All of his shared joys with Breezy, such as their adopted stray dog and "us against the world" mentality, are not enough to enable him to cope with the age difference. He breaks up with her by telling her that they amount to a dirty joke.  She's the zing in his life and he's the best score she's probably ever made.  She starts crying but keeps her composure as she gets ready to leave. Tells him to keep the dog as she doesn't have enough money to feed him.  

When Betty is injured and her new husband killed in a car accident, Frank visits her in the hospital and has a change of heart.  He drives to Marcy's house to learn where Breezy is.  Marcy tells him and he goes to the park to reconcile with her.  He reunites with Breezy, he tells her maybe they can last a year, and they walk off together with the dog, Sir Love-a-lot.

Cast
William Holden as Frank Harmon
Kay Lenz as Edith Alice 'Breezy' Breezerman
Roger C. Carmel as Bob Henderson
Marj Dusay as Betty Tobin
Joan Hotchkis as Paula Harmon
Lynn Borden as Harmon's Overnight Date
Shelley Morrison as Nancy Henderson
Eugene Peterson as Charlie
Richard Bull as Doctor
Clint Eastwood as Man in Crowd on Pier (uncredited cameo)

Production
Eastwood has described the film as a "big risk at the time" and that Universal Studios let him make the film as a favor. Eastwood "liked the whole comment on the rejuvenation of a cynic" who finds out about life through a seventeen-year-old girl, with her teaching him more about life than he does for her. Eastwood said at the time that he didn't believe the film would "make a dime" but that he was making the movie because he wanted the challenge, and because the material was different than what he was used to. Holden had not made a major film since The Wild Bunch in 1969, and he was so happy to be approached that he agreed to appear in the film for no salary, receiving instead a percentage of the profits. When the film generated no profits, the Screen Actors Guild told Eastwood that he would have to pay Holden the union minimum of $4000.

Jo Heims wrote the script about a love blossoming between a middle-aged man and a teenage girl. Heims had originally intended Eastwood to play the starring role of the realtor Frank Harmon, a bitter divorced man who falls in love with the young Breezy. Although Eastwood confessed to "understanding the Frank Harmon character" he believed he was too young at that stage to play Harmon. That part would go to William Holden, 12 years Eastwood's senior, and Eastwood then decided to direct the picture. Eastwood initially wanted to cast Jo Ann Harris, whom he had worked with in The Beguiled. Eastwood described Holden as "very astute as an actor" and that he "understood the role completely, so it was easy for him to play." After he signed for the part, Holden said to Eastwood, "You know, I've been that guy," and Eastwood responded, "Yeah, I thought so."

Casting the role of Breezy was difficult because the role was young, seventeen according to the script, and nude scenes were required. Screen tests were performed with ten actresses, all with Holden. Eastwood later remarked that it was unusual that Holden was in the screen tests with all the actresses, and that "most guys would say, 'get me some kid.' " The role of Breezy went to a young dark-haired actress named Kay Lenz, chosen because of her chemistry with Holden, who Eastwood described as "very very gentle with her, even during the screen test." According to friends of Eastwood, he became infatuated with Lenz during this period. Lenz had limited experience but approached her role energetically. Eastwood gave her veto power over nude scenes. Unless she approved them, he would not include them in the final cut.

Filming for Breezy began in November 1972 in Los Angeles and finished five weeks later. With Bruce Surtees, Eastwood's regular cinematographer, occupied elsewhere, Frank Stanley was brought in to shoot the picture, the first of four films he would shoot for Malpaso. The film was shot very quickly and efficiently and in the end went $1 million under budget and finished three days before schedule.

Holden's son Scott Holden plays a small role as a veterinarian, in his final attempt at an acting career.

Reception
Howard Thompson of The New York Times wrote, "A cloyingly naive resolution mars 'Breezy,' which opened yesterday, an otherwise engrossing drama of an aging man's infatuation with a tender-hearted 17-year-old girl derelict." Gene Siskel of the Chicago Tribune gave the film 3 stars out of 4 and wrote, "Screenwriter Jo Heims has fashioned a formula May–September love affair into a surprisingly tender and frequently witty romance in which an older man is realistically transformed by a much younger woman ... 'Breezy' frequently threatens to collapse into a stereotypical characterization, but Holden's refreshing honesty invariably revitalizes the action. In the title role, newcomer Kay Lenz is sincere, often believable, and rarely maudlin." Arthur D. Murphy of Variety called it "an okay contemporary drama" with "perhaps too much ironic, wry or broad humor for solid impact." Kevin Thomas of the Los Angeles Times wrote of Eastwood that Breezy was "a deeply felt, fully realized film that is entirely his own. It's an offbeat love story told with rare delicacy and perception that affords William Holden his most fully dimensioned role in years and introduces a smashing newcomer named Kay Lenz."

The film opened at the Columbia II theater in New York City on November 18, 1973, but flopped, grossing only $16,099 in four weeks and 5 days. Early unfavorable reviews and the poor performance caused the studio to shelve the film. It then underwent some minor re-editing and was test released in Utah in 39 theaters on July 3, 1974 on a four wall distribution basis  for two weeks. The results were positive, so Universal expanded the four wall distribution policy to the Portland and Seattle areas. During 1974, Variety tracked it grossing $140,289 in 20-24 key cities in the United States and Canada, placing it 301st on the list of their films tracked for the year, which with its gross from New York in 1973, gave it a gross of at least $156,388. Eastwood thought Universal had decided the film was going to fail long before it was released. He said "the public stayed away from it because it wasn't promoted enough, and it was sold in an uninteresting fashion". Some critics, including Eastwood's biographer Richard Schickel, believed that the sexual content of the film and love scenes were too soft to be memorable for such a potentially scandalous relationship between Harmon and Breezy, commenting that, "it is not a sexy movie. Once again, Eastwood was too polite in his eroticism." However, Schickel added that Breezy managed to recoup its low budget.

Home media release
Breezy did not reach home video until 1998. Universal Pictures released the film to DVD in 2004 with a running time of 106 minutes (NTSC). A Blu-ray was released in 2014 by the British branch of Universal, which was issuing all their Clint Eastwood catalogue on HD. The film is in widescreen and Dolby Digital 2.0 Mono. In the US, it was released on Blu-ray from Kino Lorber in August 2020.

Influences
Lenz and Breezy figure into the storyline of Philip K. Dick's novel VALIS, where the narrator Phil mentions he had a crush on her after the movie and tried approaching Lenz, only for her agent to stop him.

Excerpts from the film are used on the music track "Breezy" (sometimes titled "My Name's Breezy") by French house/alternative group Make the Girl Dance, featured on their 2011 album Everything is Gonna be OK in the End.
On 24 June 2022 he released the Album titled "Breezy".

In the Paul Thomas Anderson movie Licorice Pizza (2021), a brief subplot has Alana Haim's character auditioning for a movie called "Rainbow" that's a stand-in for Breezy, with Sean Penn playing the William Holden character. Some dialogue from Breezy was directly copied in Licorice Pizza.

See also
 List of American films of 1973

References

Bibliography

External links

 
 

1973 films
1973 romantic drama films
1970s English-language films
American romantic drama films
Films directed by Clint Eastwood
Films scored by Michel Legrand
Films set in California
Films with screenplays by Jo Heims
Malpaso Productions films
Universal Pictures films
1970s American films